Pachenar or Pa Chenar may refer to:
 Pa Chenar, Gilan
 Pachenar, Kerman
 Pachenar, Khuzestan